The 2022 NCAA Division I Men's Tennis Championships were the men's tennis tournaments played from May 6 to May 28, 2022 at campus sites and Champaign, Illinois at the Khan Outdoor Tennis Complex. It was the 76th edition of the NCAA Division I Men's Tennis Championship.

Men's team championship
There were 64 teams selected to the men's team championship, 30 of which were automatic qualifiers from each Division I conference. The remaining 34 teams were selected at-large. Teams played two rounds of single-elimination matches in groups of four from May 6-7 at campus sites; the winners of those regionals advanced to a super-regional round, also held at campus sites. The remaining eight teams advanced to the championship rounds in Champaign, Illinois.

Automatic qualifiers
The following 30 teams were automatic qualifiers, representing their conferences:

National seeds
Sixteen teams were selected as national seeds, and were guaranteed to host for the first two rounds, if they submitted a bid and met criteria. Of these 16 teams, only Middle Tennessee did not host during the first weekend.

1.  TCU  (quarterfinals)
2.  Florida (quarterfinals)
3.  Baylor (quarterfinals)
4.  Ohio State (semifinals)
5.  Michigan (quarterfinals)
6.  Tennessee (semifinals)
7.  Virginia  (National Champions)
8.  Kentucky (runner-up)
9.  Wake Forest  (Super Regionals)
10.  South Carolina (Super Regionals)
11.  Georgia  (second round)
12.  Texas (Super Regionals)
13.  USC  (Super Regionals)
14.  Harvard  (second round)
15.  North Carolina  (Super Regionals)
16.  Middle Tennessee  (second round)

Bracket
Bold indicates winner. Host institutions for the first two rounds and Super Regionals are marked with an asterisk (*). 

Bracket source:

Men's singles championship
There were 64 singles players selected to the men's singles championship, 15 of which were automatic qualifiers from each Division I conference with an eligible player ranked in the ITA Top 125. The remaining 49 players were selected at-large. The tournament was played following the team championship from May 23-28 in Champaign, Illinois.

Automatic qualifiers
The following 15 players were automatic qualifiers, representing their conferences:

National seeds
The following sixteen players were seeded for this tournament:

 Ben Shelton (Florida) (National Champion)
 Daniel Rodrigues (South Carolina)
 Adam Walton (Tennessee)
 Liam Draxl (Kentucky) 
 Adrian Boitan (Baylor)
 August Holmgren (San Diego)
 Stefan Dostanic (USC)
 Cannon Kingsley (Ohio State)

Players ranked 9th–16th, listed by last name
 Juan Carlos Aguilar (TCU)
 Clément Chidekh (Washington)
 Johannus Monday (Tennessee)
 Arthur Fery (Stanford)
 Luc Fomba (TCU)
 Nikola Slavic (Ole Miss)
 Hamish Stewart (Georgia)
 Matej Vocel (Ohio State)

Draw
Bracket:

Finals

Section 1

Section 2

Section 3

Section 4

Men's doubles championship
There were 32 doubles teams selected to the men's doubles championship, 11 of whom were automatic qualifiers from each Division I conference with an eligible player ranked in the ITA Top 60. The remaining 21 teams were selected at-large. The tournament was played following the team championship from May 23-28 in Champaign, Illinois.

Automatic qualifiers
The following 11 teams were automatic qualifiers, representing their conferences:

National seeds
The following eight teams were seeded for this tournament:

 Jacob Fearnley / Luc Fomba (TCU)
 Matej Vocel / Robert Cash (Ohio State)
 Jake Finn Bass / Sven Lah (Baylor)
 Cleeve Harper / Richard Ciamarra (Texas) (National Champions)

Players ranked 5th–8th, listed by institution
 Finlay Murgett / Tad McClean (Auburn)
 Ben Shelton / Sam Riffice (Florida)
 Eliot Spizzirri / Siem Woldeab (Texas)
 Bradley Frye / Stefan Dostanic (USC)

Draw
Bracket:

Finals

Top half

Bottom half

References

NCAA Division I tennis championships
NCAA Division I Men's Tennis Championships
NCAA Division I Men's Tennis Championships